Albert Alfred Huenke (June 26, 1891 – September 20, 1974) was a pitcher in Major League Baseball who appeared in one game for the 1914 New York Giants.

References

External links

1891 births
1974 deaths
Major League Baseball pitchers
New York Giants (NL) players
Baseball players from Ohio
Dallas Giants players
Rochester Hustlers players
Troy Trojans (minor league) players
Harrisburg Islanders players
People from New Bremen, Ohio